Chab Dai ("joining hands" in Khmer) was founded in Cambodia in 2005 by Helen Sworn. Chab Dai is a coalition of diverse stakeholders committed to working together to abolish all forms of sexual abuse, human trafficking, and exploitation. Chab Dai aims to bring an end to trafficking and sexual exploitation through coalition building, community prevention, advocacy and research. While the organization was founded in Cambodia, Chab Dai also has additional offices in the United States, Canada and the United Kingdom.

Helen Sworn 
Helen Sworn is the founder and International Director of the anti-human trafficking organization Chab Dai.

Helen had a successful business administration career that she left in order to attend a bible college in the United Kingdom. She began actively opposing human trafficking in 1999.  She has been involved in multiple anti-human-trafficking and educational initiatives in Cambodia as the International Director of Chab Dai. In 2005, she founded Chab Dai, a network of Christian organizations opposing human trafficking. She was interviewed in the 2011 human trafficking documentary film Nefarious: Merchant of Souls.

Governance
Chab Dai Cambodia is registered with the Royal Government of Cambodia's Ministry of Foreign Affairs as an international charity organization under the sponsorship of Chab Dai International. Cambodia-specific governance is assisted by a Cambodia Steering Committee, a sub-committee of Chab Dai International's Board of Directors, and is made up of representatives from Chab Dai Cambodia's coalition members.

Chab Dai International, overseen by a Board of Directors made up of international members both external and internal to other Chab Dai offices, is registered as a public benefit corporation in California (USA), and as a registered public charity with 501c3 tax-exempt status with the United States Internal Revenue Service (IRS) under EIN 26-4646578. Approved grants are made to Chab Dai Cambodia and other international projects several times per year. Financial accountability documents can be downloaded from Chab Dai's profile on Guidestar.org.

Chab Dai Canada, overseen by an autonomous Board of Directors, is registered as a charity with the Canada Revenue Agency under registration number 81890 6703 RR0001.

Chab Dai is also overseen by a registered charity in the UK, Chab Dai & Yejj Charitable Trust (registered number 1103241).

References

Anti–human trafficking activists
Charities based in California
Non-profit organisations based in Cambodia